Parapercis lutevittata, the yellow-striped sandperch, is a fish species in the sandperch family, Pinguipedidae. It is found in Japan and Taiwan.  
This species can reach a length of  TL.

References

Pinguipedidae
Taxa named by Shao Kwang-Tsao
Fish described in 2010
Fish of Japan
Fish of Taiwan